Jerry Partridge (born January 22, 1963) is an American football coach and former player. He is currently the defensive coordinator at Northern Arizona. He was previously the head football coach at Missouri Western State University in St. Joseph, Missouri, a position he had held from 1997 to 2016. Before becoming head coach at Missouri Western in 1997, Partridge assisted various teams from 1986 to 1996. Partridge was a graduate assistant for the 1988 Notre Dame Fighting Irish football team, who won the national championship.

Personal life
Partridge and his wife, Pam, have two children, Travis and Lindsey. Partridge is the son of Linda and Gerald Partridge, who coached at Ruskin High School for 29 years.

Head coaching record

References

External links
 Delta State profile

1963 births
Living people
Austin Peay Governors football coaches
Delta State Statesmen football coaches
Missouri Tigers football coaches
Missouri Western Griffons football coaches
Missouri Western Griffons football players
Murray State Racers football coaches
Notre Dame Fighting Irish football coaches
People from Grandview, Missouri